Stephanie Vogt successfully defended her title by defeating Kathinka von Deichmann 6–2, 6–2 in the final.

Draw

Draw

References
 Main Draw

Women's Singles